Sardar Bhupinder Singh Mann, born in Gujranwala (now in Pakistan) on 15 September 1939 was nominated to the Rajya Sabha in 1990 by the Honorable President of India as recognition to his contribution to the farmers' struggle. He served from 1990–1996. His family moved from Lyallpur, now Faisalabad during partition to settle at Batala. His father S. Anoop Singh was a prominent landlord of the area and Chak 207 in Faisalabad is still named after him.

Socio-political activities
He was one of founder members of  "Farmer Friends Association" in 1966, which grew to a state level organization Known as "Punjab Kheti Bari Union", which further grew to a National level Kisan organization, "Bharti Kisan Union" (BKU) and coordinated with other farmers organizations to form Kisan Coordination Committee (KCC).  In 1967 he helped the candidate of Jan Sangh Party, Brig. Bikramjit Singh Bajwa. Took charge of his entire election as an Election Agent.  Defeated Pt. Mohan Lal, the then Home Minister in Kairon Ministry.  He had the zeal to fight corruption from the very beginning which was deeply inculcated in him by his mother Smt Harbans Kaur, who faced the brunt of dislocation during the partition of India in 1947. Sardar Mann in 1968, resisted rampant corruption in the Food Corporation of India. Took a pledge over blood in the market yard Batala, not to fall prey to corrupt officials, uprooting bribery in purchase of paddy by FCI. In 1969 he became Director of Cooperative Sugar Mills, Batala.

In 1972, he led the agitation for cleansing and redefining the sugar cane supply system to the sugar mills which resulted in formation of Calendar System of sugar cane supply before the start of each crushing season. This was a landmark in the Sugar cane procurement system.  In 1974 he led an agitation against Zonal Restrictions of movement of wheat. He launched a successful Agitation against Hike in Electric Power Tariff. He was arrested along with hundreds of Kisans, to be released only after Punjab Government withdrew the hiked tariff.

In 1975, Emergency was imposed in India by the then Prime Minister Smt Indira Gandhi. He and his organisation opposed the imposition of Emergency and was jailed for several months along with many kisans.

He continued his struggle to uplift the farmers and launched a "Lekhe Patte Da morcha" (a morcha launched for persuading the Government to give account of loans due from farmers vis-à-vis the economic squeeze of the farmers).  In 1976 he spearheaded a successful agitation against supply of tractors with manufacturing defects (Tractor Morcha).

He led the agitation for regulating diesel supply to farmers in 1977. He also led an agitation for providing support price of potatoes, which the State Government had to accept as demanded by the farmers.
He was arrested in 1979 along with farmers from many states when they participated in Agitation in 1979 against taking over of Charagah at Vill Kanjhawala, in Delhi.

In 1980, he was elected the Elected State President Bharti Kisan Union. He remained the President of the State BKU up to 1989. He spearheaded the famous sugar cane agitation which changed the complete picture of sugar cane farming 1981. The agitation culminated in getting sugarcane price hiked from Rs. 16 per quintal to Rs. 28 per quintal.

He was instrumental in nationalising the farmers movement and in 1981, the BKU and Shetkari Sangathna (farmers' body from Maharashtra under the leadership of Sh. Sharad Joshi) joined hands in a Joint meeting.

In 1984, he was elected National President Bharti Kisan Union 1984 and re-launched the agitation for defying for Zonal Restrictions of movement of wheat.

In March 1984, a historical an unmatched agitation was launched under his leadership during an agitation when Punjab Raj Bhawan (residence of the Punjab Governor) was Gheraoed (seized) for seven days by lakhs of farmers from various states under the banner of BKU. This was immediately followed by a historical agitation of Boycott of Sale of Wheat from 1 to 7 May as a result of which not a single kilogram of wheat came to Punjab Markets.

Various news clippings can be viewed at:-
https://www.facebook.com/media/set/?set=a.204955936230747.50285.100001490260539&type=3

He was instrumental in the formation of the all India level Kisan Coordination Committee (KCC) which is a coordinating platform of various State level Farmers organizations, currently 17 in number.  In 1985, he was elected Chairman Kisan Coordination Committee (1985–1988).

In 1986, he launched an Anti-corruption drive and lakhs of rupees was got returned from the corrupt officials. He also got the waiver of arrears of Brick Lining of canal Distributaries amounting to Rs. 3.50 billion.  In 1989, he was nominated as Member of Consultative Committee of Punjab State Electricity Board, PSEB for the term of 1989–1990.

Nominated to Rajya Sabha
In 1990, he was nominated to Rajya Sabha.

During his tenure as a Member of Parliament, he raised 118 starred or un-starred questions in the Rajya Sabha.

Few special achievements in Parliament:

 This was for the first time that the then Prime Minister, Mr. Narasimha Rao, while replying to his question, had to accept in Rajya Sabha, that Indian Farmers are victims of Negative Support amounting to 72% of value of agriculture produce. This was done after extensive research work on agriculture costing, subsidisation and other parameters governing the intricate economics of agriculture.
 Agriculture Minister Mr. Balram Jakhar, was made to admit on the floor of Rajya Sabha that Farmers cannot freely add value to their produce, not even shell rice from their paddy produce.
 Main focus in the Rajya Sabha remained to explore and raise the economic issues of farmers of the country.

In 1995, continuing his struggle, and to highlight the Zonal restriction levied by the Government to suppress the costs of agriculture produces, he led an agitation to press government to allow free movement of wheat. He being a Sitting Member of Rajya Sabha was arrested along with hundreds of farmers while breaking un-announced restrictions on movement of wheat.

He was a member of delegation of Indian Members of Parliament to UN in 1995.

Later activities
In 1997, he led a march to Wagha Border, along with Sh. Sharad Joshi and thousands of farmers from Maharashtra, Haryana, Uttar Pradesh, Madhya Pradesh, and Punjab, as a symbolic gesture to impress for free trade route through Pakistan. In 1998, there was a spate of suicides by farmers in Punjab due to rising debt. Alarmed, he led thousands of farmers to pray and pledge before Shri Akal Takhat Sahib, Amritsar, not to commit suicides, but to fight against anti-farmer policies, on 15 August 1998. An agitation was launched in 2000 against procurement of Paddy at prices even lower than Minimum Support Price (MSP) fixed by the Government of India. During 2001, there was an ongoing debate on the benefits of WTO. Many people were raising doubts on the opening of the Indian economy. He organised a talk on WTO by Sh. Sharad Joshi and other renowned scholars at Chandigarh, to highlight the rights of farmers to be liberated from the unconstitutional and inhuman economic blockade.  Thousands of farmers attended and got educated on the true picture. In 2002, under his leadership, the BKU in Punjab supported Congress to power in Punjab. In 2003 he led a successful Agitation against the Punjab Government (Congress which his party had supported to Power) to get the arrears of sugarcane, by organising a massive Dharna, at National Highway at Dina Nagar, Gurdaspur district, and afterwards Gheraoing DC Gurdaspur Office Complex for continuous 16 days. This resulted in release of all the arrears of 800 million rupees.  He participated in Global Forum on Agricultural Research at Dakar, Senegal. May 2003. He was re-elected Chairman of the KCC for three years in 2003.

He led a massive Kisan rally in front of Parliament of India in New Delhi highlighting lower than cost of production procurement prices of food grains, paddy, wheat and sugar cane and payment of arrears of sugar cane in 2003. The Chief Minister of Punjab, Captain Amarinder Singh also sat in the agitation along with the farmers. In 2004, he organised a seminar on the significance and importance of the River Water issues. Capt Amarinder Singh, CM Punjab was honoured for taking a bold step on protecting the rights of Punjab in this regard. In 2005, he was invited to attend the World Agriculture Forum meet at St. Louis, USA from 16–18 May 2005 on the issue "The key to Peace, Security and Growth- Local Regional and Global Agri Food System". He was nominated as a Member of Sub Committee of Central Electricity Regulatory Commission in 2009. BKU, under his leadership supported Congress in Punjab and Haryana for the Lok Sabha Elections.  In 2010, he organised meeting of the Kisan Coordination Committee in September 2010 under his Chairmanship in which one of the main issues discussed was regarding land acquisition, which is a burning issue in India at the moment. While discussing the issue of land acquisition, it was stressed that the fact that in India, companies are allowed to purchase thousands of acres of land and earn profits to the tune of crores of rupees whereas on the other hand, land Ceiling Act is implemented against the poor farmers who cannot even sustain themselves on whatever little land they have.  This clearly shows the callous attitude of the governments towards the farmers.  That the Companies, either themselves or through the government, which takes the land from the poor farmers and after acquiring it, gives it to multinational companies at throw away prices who can otherwise also purchase the said land at market price and when it comes to farmers, the land Ceiling Act comes into play.  It was also stressed that such a policy should not be made by the Government without consulting the members of the Kisan Coordination Committee and in case the Government went ahead with the draconian laws and policies framed against the farmers, the Kisan Coordination Committee would start its nationwide protest against the Government from its next Convention proposed to be held at Kerala.

In 2012, he and his BKU fully supported the Congress party under the command of Capt Amarinder Singh because of his pro farmer approach, clean governance and administrative skills.
 
In 2012, he led a delegation to Sh Rahul Gandhi to request him that Government should start giving payments to the farmers directly instead through the commission agents (direct payment to farmers). Gandhi was convinced and he deputed a team to visit Punjab to carry out a detailed study on this aspect.
In 2012, UPA government had opened up FDI in retail. He led a team to thank Smt Sonia Gandhi ji for this farmer friendly step. He presented a badge of BKU to Smt Sonia Gandhi ji for this historic step. 
In 2013, he gave a detailed memorandum to Sh. Jai Ram Ramesh, the then Rural Development Minister  to request him to include small and marginal farmers in the MNREGA. This suggestion was greatly appreciated and this scheme was included in MNREGA as an amendment to the act. 
In 2014, Sh Rahul Gandhi invited him for suggestions on the Congress Manifesto (2014 polls). He gave very elaborate suggestions to him during a session organised at Ghanaur, Panipat. 
UPA government had passed a historic Act to protect farmers in land acquisition. But when Modi Government came to power, they wanted to dilute this Act. However, he on behalf of BKU and KCC submitted his strong opposition (2015) to any dilution to this Act before the committee headed by SS. Ahluwalia, MP.   
In 2014 and 2015 he led a delegation (three times) of BKU to submit memorandum to Punjab Governors (Sh. Shivraj Patel and Prof Kaptan Sinh Solanki) to highlight the plight of Punjab farmers because the then Punjab Government had fully failed in protecting the interests of farmers. 
In 2016 he led a delegation of BKU to meet the Chief Electoral officer Punjab requesting him to make the election manifesto legally binding document. 
In 2016/2017 he and his BKU fully supported Capt Amarinder Singh led Congress party. He canvassed for Congress candidates in many constituencies and highlighted the leadership qualities of Capt Amarinder Singh and his pro-farmer work done during his last tenure. 
In 2017 April he organised a National Level meeting of KCC at Chandigarh. From here he launched a uniqu andolan “Jo vada kia vo nibhana padega” to force Modi Government to fulfil his poll promise of implementing Swaminathan Report. This andolan was spread throughout the nation by the KCC. This andolan has spread like a wild fire across nation and has pushed the Modi Government to the corner.    
Currently, he is National President of BKU and Chairman of the All India Kisan Coordination Committee.

References

External links 
 
 
 
 http://www.downtoearth.org.in/content/farmers-split-merits-dunkel-proposals
 
 
 
 
 
 
 https://web.archive.org/web/20120513045257/http://www.chiefkhalsadiwan.com/gurdas.htm
 
 
 http://www.docstoc.com/docs/68498100/Commodity-Market-Project-Report
 
 
 
 http://pdf.usaid.gov/pdf_docs/PDACO440.pdf
 https://web.archive.org/web/20160304080835/http://www.columbia.edu/~sr793/doc/VVakulabharanam.pdf
 
 
 
 https://web.archive.org/web/20060511204358/http://www.egfar.org/documents/02_-_Meetings/Conferences/GFAR_2003/GFAR2003-00-02.en.pdf

1939 births
Living people
People from Gujranwala
Nominated members of the Rajya Sabha
Activists from Punjab, India
Agriculture in India
Indian social reformers